New Sensations is the thirteenth solo studio album by American rock musician Lou Reed, released in April 1984 by RCA Records. John Jansen and Reed produced the album. New Sensations peaked at No. 56 on the U.S. Billboard 200 and at No. 92 on the UK Albums Chart. This marked the first time that Reed charted within the US Top 100 since 1978's Street Hassle, and the first time that Reed had charted in the UK altogether since 1976's Coney Island Baby. Three singles were released from the album: "I Love You, Suzanne", "My Red Joystick" and "High in the City", with "I Love You, Suzanne" being the only single to chart, peaking at No. 78 on the UK Singles Chart. The music video for "I Love You, Suzanne" did, however, receive light rotation on MTV.

"Open Invitation", an unreleased song from the album's recording sessions in late 1983, was released online in March 2023.

Robert Quine's involvement
Guitarist Robert Quine, who had played on Reed's previous two studio albums, The Blue Mask (1982) and Legendary Hearts (1983), had had a falling-out with Reed during the recording sessions, so Reed opted to play most of the guitar parts on the album himself, with the exceptions being "My Red Joystick" and "My Friend George", which feature Fernando Saunders providing rhythm guitar. Years after the album's release, Fernando Saunders claimed that one of the issues during recording was that Robert Quine had personally composed the "guitar riff" for "I Love You, Suzanne" in the studio while the band was rehearsing. Upon hearing Quine's riff, Reed had written the lyrics to the song, but he had failed to give Quine a co-writing credit for the song in the album credits, thus cutting Quine out of royalties which added further strain to their relationship. Despite their falling out, Quine later joined Reed for the world tour in support of the album.

Critical reception

Upon release, New Sensations received favorable reviews from music critics. Writing for The Village Voice, music journalist Robert Christgau stated that "instead of straining fruitlessly to top himself, Reed has settled into a pattern as satisfying as what he had going with the Velvets, though by definition it isn't as epochal. The music is simple and inevitable, and even the sarcastic songs are good sarcastic songs". In Rolling Stone, Kurt Loder called it "a long-overdue delight that's all the more exciting for being completely unexpected."

Robert Palmer of The New York Times praised New Sensations, along with Reed's preceding studio albums The Blue Mask and Legendary Hearts, as "uniformly splendid, ranking with the very best of [Reed's] earlier solo work."

Ira Robbins of Trouser Press addressed Reed's decision to play all the guitar parts himself, describing the result as "anything but self-indulgent. Forsaking the two-guitar sound just throws Saunders' distinctive fretless bass playing and Reed's spare arrangements into higher relief, and they merit the attention – as do the songs, which prove that a middle-aged rock songwriter can have plenty to offer."

New Sensations would later place ninth in The Village Voices annual Pazz & Jop critics' poll.

In a retrospective review for AllMusic, critic Mark Deming wrote of the album, "New Sensations showed that Reed had a lot more warmth and humanity than he was given credit for, and made clear that he could 'write happy' when he felt like, with all the impact of his 'serious' material."

Track listing

Personnel
Credits are adapted from the New Sensations liner notes.

Musicians
 Lou Reed – vocals; lead and rhythm guitar
 Fernando Saunders – electric and string bass; backing vocals; rhythm guitar on "My Red Joystick" and "My Friend George"
 Fred Maher – drums
 Peter Wood – piano; synthesizers; accordion
 Lakshminarayana Shankar – electric violin
 Michael Brecker – tenor saxophone
 Randy Brecker – trumpet
 Jon Faddis – trumpet
 Tom Malone – trombone; horn arrangement
 Jocelyn Brown – backing vocals
 Rory Dodd – backing vocals
 Connie Harvey – backing vocals
 Eric Troyer – backing vocals

Production and artwork
 John Jansen – producer
 Lou Reed – producer 
 Dan Nash – assistant engineer
 Roger Moutenot – assistant engineer 
 Greg Calbi – mastering
 Waring Abbott – photography; art direction

Charts

See also
 List of albums released in 1984
 Lou Reed's discography

References

External links
 

1984 albums
Lou Reed albums
RCA Records albums
Albums produced by Lou Reed